Anya Sofia Corazon is a fictional superhero appearing in American comic books published by Marvel Comics. The character was created by Marvel editor-in-chief Joe Quesada, writer Fiona Avery, and artist Mark Brooks, and made her first appearance in Amazing Fantasy #1 (August 2004) under the pseudonym Araña and later in Young Allies #5 (October 2010) with the codename Spider-Girl. She is the Latina daughter of a Puerto Rican father and a Mexican mother.

Publication history
Anya Corazon was created by Marvel Comics editor-in-chief Joe Quesada, writer Fiona Avery, and artist Mark Brooks, and is based on ideas J. Michael Straczynski used in his run on The Amazing Spider-Man. Araña was the star of the resurrected Amazing Fantasy comic book in 2004. After her storyline ended in Amazing Fantasy #6, she appeared in her own twelve issue series Araña: The Heart of the Spider, starting in March 2005 as part of Marvel Next. The character next appeared in the Ms. Marvel title as a recruit for service as a licensed superhero under the Superhuman Registration Act.

She next appears teaming up with Nomad to fight the secret empire in a backup story in Captain America #602-605. Chronologically, her next appearance was during the "Grim Hunt" storyline in The Amazing Spider-Man; however, her appearance in the new Young Allies series was published first.

As the new Spider-Girl, she starred in a monthly Spider-Girl comic that debuted on November 17, 2010 as a tie-in to the "Big Time" storyline in The Amazing Spider-Man,. With the change of moniker to Spider-Girl, she's the second published character to adopt the "Spider-Girl" alter-ego, but she actually comes prior to the first character in the chronology of the Marvel Universe. It was announced concurrently with the announcement of the series' cancellation that Anya would be receiving a new mini-series as part of the Spider-Island crossover. The first issue of the mini-series was released one month after the final issue of the cancelled series, and one month after the mini-series ended Anya appeared in one issue of Avengers Academy.

Recently, Anya was one of the main characters in Marvel's Spider-Verse event, which led to a spinoff miniseries in Secret Wars, which she was also included in. She was one of the stars in the team comic Web Warriors as a part of All-New, All-Different Marvel.

Fictional character biography

Origin

On her first day at Milton Summers High School in Fort Greene, Brooklyn, Anya is friends with classmate Lynn Sakura. She is later caught in a skirmish between two mystical clans, the Spider Society and the Sisterhood of the Wasp, and is mortally wounded. To save her life, the mage Miguel Legar from the Spider Society performs a ritual on her by giving her a spider-shaped tattoo that endows her with spider-like powers, and recruits her to be a Hunter for the Spider Society. WebCorps operatives Nina Smith and Ted Mankowski offer her various costumes, but she decides to make her own costume. She designs a costume as "Araña" with red and blue sneakers, blue track pants, red backpack, red gloves with many pockets, and large yellow-lensed goggles. As part of her powers, an insectoid exoskeleton covers most of her body with a bug-like bluish skin. In place of equipment like web-shooters or spider tracers, Anya created her own modified bolas out of discs that are about the size of her palm and have eight red legs able to grip objects. Anya fights a Hunter from The Sisterhood of the Wasp, adversaries of the Spider Society.

Heart of the Spider
While interrogating a spy for the Sisterhood of the Wasp, Anya and Miguel discover that the Sisterhood of the Wasp has recruited a fifteen-year-old boy codenamed Amun, a descendant of Egyptian assassins who believes the boy is skilled enough to not need to conceal his own identity. Anya soon meets Amun who has enrolled at her school under the name Jon Kasiya. The two soon deduce the other's dual identity. Later, during a fight with Anya, Miguel, and the Sisterhood of the Wasp, Amun tells her that Amun will attack her loved ones if she opposes. Noting her father Gil Corazon is filming the fight, Anya takes Gil to safety. In her absence, Amun seriously wounds Miguel. The encounter leaves Anya doubting her duty due to the danger it poses to her loved ones. However, in a chance encounter, Spider-Man arrives and, after discussing her origins and adventures, tells her, "With great power comes great responsibility" and that in every age, people are called to be heroes. Soon afterward, Anya fights Amun and, in anger, nearly strangles Amun to death. She is stopped and Amun runs. She learns she had released "the Spirit of the Hunter" and warned not to do it again without Miguel with her. Back at WebCorps, Miguel is revived upon being reunited with Anya, and Miguel tells her the organization's history that would eventually split into Wasps and Spiders. After an encounter with a gunman in a coffee shop, in which Anya saves Lynn and Amun without revealing her secret identity, Amun promises to respect her double life and to stop targeting her friends and family.

Night of the Hunter
The Sisterhood of the Wasp recruits Jaime Jade, a Mexican crime lord who has mental abilities that allows to hypnotize other people and was involved in the death of her mother Sofia Corazon. Miguel stops Anya from going after Jade alone with the promise that Anya can punish Jade afterwards. Anya and Amun develop a loose truce because Amun has lost his father as well, so he checks into Jade's possible involvement in Sofia's death. Jade hypnotizes Anya into fighting Miguel, but she eventually breaks free of the control and knocks Jade out. When Jade wakes up, the car Jade is in is suspended by a rope over the river. Jade thinks she's bluffing, saying "Little miss super hero won't want my death on her conscience." to which she replies "No, my conscience feels fine," and lets go of the rope. Amun arrives too late, but Anya reluctantly dives into the water to save Jade but the crime lord has already escaped.

Spider-Man/Araña: The Hunter Revealed
In the one-shot Spider-Man/Araña: the Hunter Revealed, she discovers that her exoskeleton is not an ability from being a Hunter, and she has in fact never been a true Hunter. While facing a gigantic monster summoned by the Wasps, she grants her Hunter abilities to Nina and renounces Webcorps. After Miguel is killed saving Nina from the Wasps' hunter, Nina is Webcorps' chosen champion, and Anya is free to pursue a new fate.

Civil War

The pro-registration heroes have tasked Carol Danvers and Wonder Man to find Anya, convince her to register, and train her. After foiling an attempted robbery, Anya and her father are taken into custody where Gil learns of Anya's superpowers. Gil is proud to let her train with Ms. Marvel and Wonder Man. Anya's training will essentially comprise her accompanying Wonder Man and Ms. Marvel on missions and playing "sidekick" to the two. Anya accompanies the two to Stark Tower, where she forces herself into a meeting with Iron Man, and then on a mission to capture the Shroud and Arachne (aka Julia
Carpenter). Arachne escapes, but the Shroud is captured and taken into S.H.I.E.L.D. custody. A strike team led by Ms. Marvel and Wonder Man arrives at the home of Arachne's parents to take into custody. After a battle between the heroes, Julia Carpenter is arrested and her daughter Rachel Carpenter forcibly separated. Anya is deeply shaken by the ordeal and states that if being a hero means separating a mother from her child, she wants no part of it. However, she remains part of the pro-Registration strikeforce.

Before a battle with Doomsday Man, Ms. Marvel asks Anya to go get help if she fails to make contact by a certain time. Eventually, Anya joins the battle, and Doomsday Man rips away her exoskeleton, severely injuring her. Although she eventually recovers, her exoskeleton is gone. Gil takes out a restraining order to keep Ms. Marvel away from her, but Anya secretly visits Ms. Marvel to say she is not to blame for what happened. Soon after, Anya quits her job, and is confronted by Arachne who is enraged and demands to know Rachel's whereabouts. Anya manages to subdue Arachne, but chooses to accompany Ms. Marvel and Arachne in their attempt to find Rachel, even though that means violating the restraining order her father has placed against Ms. Marvel.

Anya gets into a fight with Gil for treating her like a child after Gil accuses her of seeing Ms. Marvel. She tells Gil at least Carol is showing her how to grow up. She is later captured by Chilean soldiers who deliver her to the Puppet Master; she is added to a collection of female heroes that includes Stature, Dusk, Tigra, and Silverclaw. During a battle with Ms. Marvel's team, Anya is partially subdued by Machine Man and Sleepwalker, and resists the Puppet Master's command that she kill Ms. Marvel whom she sees as a mother figure.

Grim Hunt

During the Kravinoff family's hunt for "Spiders", Anya is targeted as a sacrifice. Spider-Man, Julia, Madame Web, and Kaine come to her aid. Despite their help, Anya is knocked out by Ana Kravinoff, Alyosha Kravinoff, and Vladimir Kravinoff. Anya is captured along with Julia and Madame Web while Kaine (who was dressed as Spider-Man) is sacrificed as part of a ritual for Kraven the Hunter's resurrection. Spider-Man manages to free them and she assists Spider-Man in taking down the Kravinoffs. After the experience, Julia (who received Madame Web's powers) decides to give the old Spider-Girl costume to Anya, despite the fact that Anya has no powers. She is referred to as Spider-Girl, much to her chagrin.

Young Allies
Anya (still known as Araña) was next seen teaming up with the new Nomad (Rikki Barnes) to investigate the Secret Empire. Although information Araña obtained from her father turned out to be a trap, the pair nonetheless bonded, and shared secret identities. Both she and Rikki join the superhero group Young Allies together.

Anya joins the superhero group Young Allies along with her friend Rikki despite being depowered. During the team's first storyline, Anya and Rikki are kidnapped by a team of teenaged supervillains known as the Bastards of Evil. The Bastards link up a video feed of the bound and gagged heroines across televisions, computers, and cell phones throughout New York City, with the intent of executing the girls in order to build up reputations. After having the duct tape ripped from her mouth by Electro's daughter Aftershock, Anya cleverly divides the villains by informing them that Aftershock has lied about her parentage in order to get a spot on the Bastards. With their captors distracted, Anya and Rikki escape and ultimately defeat the Bastards once the rest of the Young Allies arrive.

Spider-Girl
Anya accepts the "Spider-Girl" moniker and begins operating solo, although she frequently interacts with her Young Allies teammates such as Rikki as well as Spider-Man and the Invisible Woman. When Gil is killed, she fights the Red Hulk who she initially believes is responsible. She is eventually convinced that the Red Hulk did not kill Gil, but rather a target of the assassination attempt that also killed her father. She eventually is able to stop the Raven Society organization that was behind Gil's death, and the intervening time shows that she made friends with Rocky Flint and fought Ana Kravinoff, the new Hobgoblin, and Screwball.

Later, the Young Allies and several members of the Avengers Academy are kidnapped by Arcade. Anya manages to escape, and works with Reptil to rescue the remaining captives. The two teens flirt with one another, and Anya ends up giving her phone number to Reptil once Arcade is defeated.

During the Fear Itself storyline, Anya, X-23, Amadeus Cho, Power Man, and Thunderstrike are teleported to a station in the middle of the Pacific Ocean where they fight samurai Shark Men. Later, Anya and the Young Allies are almost beaten by Hydro-Man until Spider-Man shows up.

Spider-Island
During the Spider-Island storyline, Anya is attacked by the Sisterhood of the Wasp. She ends up getting an unlikely ally in the Hobgoblin who then flies her to see the Kingpin. When Spider-Girl asks why the Kingpin wants her help, the Kingpin reveals that the crime lord has developed Spider abilities and ended up targeted by the Sisterhood of the Wasp. The Kingpin tells Spider-Girl of locating the Central Wasp Nest. Spider-Girl refuses the Kingpin's help and tries enlisting the help of the Young Allies and other heroes, but they are too preoccupied with the Spider outbreak to help. The new Madame Web approaches Spider-Girl and tells her that for better or for worse, she has to team up with her enemy. As they battle against the Society of Wasps, their queen reveals that they have developed a venom to kill all spider-powered people in Manhattan. Spider-Girl, Hobgoblin, the Kingpin, and the Hand fight against the Society of Wasps until Spider-Girl realizes what Madame Web really meant by teaming up with her enemy. She gets everyone fighting the Wasps to temporarily assist the Wasps in fighting the spider invasion so the spiders cannot help Adriana Soria, allowing Spider-Man and the Avengers to defeat the Spider-Queen without being overrun by the spiders. In the aftermath, Anya retains her spider powers.

Avengers
Anya is part of the new class of students when the Avengers Academy moves to the West Coast Avengers' former headquarters.

During the Inhumanity crossover, Anya gets help from various Avengers (Spider-Woman, Black Widow, the Hulk, and Wolverine) when trying to track down her social studies teacher who was kidnapped while inside an Inhuman cocoon.

Spider-Verse
Spider-Girl joined Spider-Man, Spider-Woman and other spider totems from all over the multiverse to fight the Inheritors who threatened to destroy every Spider from all realities in the event Spider-Verse. Her abilities were indispensable for the Spider-Army to discover the Inheritors' plan, as her powers and relationship with the Spider Society allowed her to read their scrolls.

After the Inheritors were defeated and exiled to an irradiated Earth, the spider totems proceeded to return to their respective realities. After the universe of Spider-UK was revealed to have been destroyed while he was fighting the Inheritors, he decided to stay in Loomworld, the former base of the Inheritors, and use the Web of Life and Destiny to reach out to any reality in need of a Spider-Man. Spider-Girl decided to join him in order to make use of her knowledge of the totems.

Secret Wars
During the Secret Wars event when all universes were destroyed and their remains formed a single planet called Battleworld, Anya and Spider-UK found themselves in the domain called Arachnia with no memories of how they got there. They eventually discovered and teamed up with other Spider-powered people (consisting of Spider-Woman, Spider-Ham, Spider-Man Noir, and Spider-Man: India), neither of whom remembered their previous encounter during the original Spider-Verse.

Web Warriors
Following the conclusion of Secret Wars the team of six Spiders that formed during the event will rename itself and feature in a new ongoing series called Web Warriors, a name that was coined by Peter Parker from the Ultimate Spider-Man TV series during the original Spider-Verse.

Powers and abilities

As Araña
As Araña, she originally possessed superhuman strength (able to lift three tons), speed, stamina, reflexes/reactions, agility, coordination, balance, and endurance. Anya had the ability to cling to walls, and to sprout a spider-like exoskeleton around her body which enhanced these abilities and protected her from damage. When her exoskeleton was ripped out by Doomsday Man, she retained her primary powers. Anya invented spider-like grappling hooks, which she uses to swing from buildings and as whip-like weapons, though she has found these to be harder to use since losing her abilities.

As Spider-Girl

Writer Paul Tobin stated In an interview with Newsarama that as Spider-Girl, the character initially lacks superpowers, but Tobin will be "staying away from having her feel crippled by any power loss; it's for sure on her mind, but Anya is a character that wants to focus on what she can do." Tobin revealed that Anya regains her powers in the "Spider-Island" storyline. The Jackal copies Spider-Man's powers into the entire non-superhuman population of New York, including Anya. Anya submits to the mass cure, but retains her copy of these powers nonetheless.

Other versions

Marvel Team-Up: League of Losers
Araña features in an arc of Robert Kirkman's Marvel Team-Up vol. 3 featuring a group of C-list heroes dubbed "The League of Losers". A group of heroes including Araña, Darkhawk, Dagger, Gravity, X-23, Sleepwalker, and Terror go to the future to prevent the villain Chronok from stealing Reed Richards' time machine, (Chronok comes to the present after killing all of Marvel's major heroes). Araña however, dies in an explosion while the team searches for a time machine so that they can travel to the future. The rest of the team succeeds however, and Chronok is defeated. Due to the Marvel Universe's method for resolving time travel paradoxes, this story takes place in an alternate timeline.

What If?
In the What If? Spider-Man: Grim Hunt, an alternative possibility for the events of Grim Hunt begins with the decision of Spider-Man to kill Kraven. Araña, scarred by things that she should not have seen is transported by the new Madame Web to her residence. Later Madame Web appears in her room in the middle of the night asking Anya to be Spider-Girl. Anya refuses the proposal because she is worried that if she fights against Peter she will make the same decision he made. In the middle of the battle Madame Web teleports herself to get Araña to confront and defeat Peter. Peter ends up blinded by a shotgun he was attempting to use on her. Araña takes over as the head Spider while Peter is left permanently blinded and distant from Mary Jane.

MC2
In the MC2 continuity, an adult version of Anya Corazon as Araña, still accompanied by Miguel (sometimes being referred to as Michael), tests Spider-Girl, then covers for her, posing as a fake seer to throw the Hobgoblin off track when he tries to find her weaknesses. She later takes over Spider-Girl's body in an attempt to take down the Black Tarantula, but the two end up trapped in each other's bodies. Using Spider-Girl's body, Anya is able to get close to Black Tarantula to kiss. However, Black Tarantula, who had been kissed by Anya once before, recognizes and attacks her, using his own powers to reverse the mind-switch. It is later revealed Anya and Black Tarantula have a personal history with one another, and they bond once more when the Tarantula is attacked by Spider-Girl's symbiotic clone April. As the gang war concludes, Black Tarantula agrees to give up his title as the current Kingpin of Crime and decides to marry Anya.

Status as first Latina superhero
The promotional copy on the digest collection extols the character as Marvel's first Hispanic superhero. However, she was preceded by El Aguila, Cecilia Reyes, Feral, Firebird, Living Lightning, Skin, Spider-Man 2099, Hector Ayala, Angela del Toro, Sunspot, Rictor, and La Bandera.

In other media

Television
 Anya Corazon appears as a main character in Spider-Man, voiced by Melanie Minichino. This version is a best friend of Spider-Man, Miles Morales, Gwen Stacy / Ghost-Spider and Harry Osborn / Hobgoblin as well as a top student at Max Modell's Horizon High. She developed spider-powers during season one and later adopts the Spider-Girl alias in subsequent seasons.
 Anya Corazon as Spider-Girl appears in Marvel Super Hero Adventures, voiced by Gigi Saul Guerrero.

Video games
 Anya Corazon as Spider-Girl appears in several cards in the mobile card game Marvel: War of Heroes.
 Anya Corazon as Araña and Spider-Girl appear as separate playable characters in Spider-Man Unlimited.
 Anya Corazon as Spider-Girl appears as a playable character in Marvel Avengers Alliance.
 Anya Corazon as Spider-Girl dressed in her Araña costume appears as a playable character in Marvel Avengers Academy, voiced by Daisy Guevera.

Collected editions
 Araña Collections
Araña Vol. 1: Heart of the Spider (collects Amazing Fantasy #1-6, softcover )
Araña Vol. 2: In The Beginning (collects Araña #1-6, softcover )
Araña Vol. 3: Night of the Hunter (collects Araña #7-12, softcover )
 Spider-Man: Grim Hunt crossover event (collects Amazing Spider-Man: Extra! #3, Web of Spider-Man #7, and Amazing Spider-Man #634-637, hardcover , softcover )
 Young Allies: Volume 1 (collects Young Allies #1-6, Firestar #1, and material from Age of Heroes #2, softcover )
 Spider-Girl Vol. 1: Family Values (collects Spider-Girl #1-8, and Amazing Spider-Man #648, softcover )
 Spider-Island: Companion (collects The Amazing Spider-Girl #1-3, Spider-Island: Cloak & DAGGER #1-3, Spider-Island: Deadly Hands of Kung Fu #1-3, Herc #7-8, Spider-Island: Avengers #1, Spider-Island: Spider-Woman #1, Spider-Island: I Love New York City, Black Panther #524, Spider-Island: Heroes For Hire #1, hardcover , softcover )

References

External links
 Araña at Marvel.com
 
 Araña at the Marvel Directory
 Araña at SpiderFan.org
 Spider-Man/Araña: The Hunter Revealed at SpiderFan.org
 Fiona Avery on Araña: The Heart of the Spider at UGO

2005 comics debuts
Comics about women
Comics characters introduced in 2004
Fictional characters from Brooklyn
Mexican superheroes
Puerto Rican superheroes
Spider-Man characters
Spider-Woman
Marvel Next
Marvel Comics mutates
Marvel Comics female superheroes
Marvel Comics characters with superhuman strength
Marvel Comics characters who can move at superhuman speeds